Gabriel Vallés (born 31 May 1986) is an Argentine footballer.

Career
His debut in the Argentine First Division was in 2006 against Gimnasia y Esgrima de Jujuy playing for Godoy Cruz de Mendoza.

He was part of the winning squad that won the Copa Sudamericana 2010 with Independiente de Avellaneda .

Honours

References

1986 births
Living people
Argentine footballers
Club Atlético Independiente footballers
Godoy Cruz Antonio Tomba footballers
Argentine Primera División players
Association football midfielders
Sportspeople from Mendoza Province